Tell Me You Do Everything for Me (Italian: Dimmi che fai tutto per me) is a 1976 Italian comedy film directed by Pasquale Festa Campanile and starring Johnny Dorelli, Pamela Villoresi and Jacques Dufilho.

Cast
 Johnny Dorelli as Francesco Salmarani 
 Pamela Villoresi as Mary Mancini 
 Jacques Dufilho as 'Dodo' Spinacroce 
 Maria Grazia Spina as Paola Signorini - Francesco's lover 
 Nanni Svampa as Bonomelli aka il Biondino 
 Enzo Robutti as Felegatti 
 Ferdinando Murolo as Roberto Mancuso aka Robbie 
 Stefano Amato as Mino Salmarani 
 Francesco D'Adda as Caputo - The Police Commissioner's Assistant 
 Andréa Ferréol as Miriam Spinacroce 
 Pino Caruso as The Police Commissioner

References

Bibliography 
 Roberto Chiti, Roberto Poppi, Mario Pecorari. Dizionario del cinema italiano: Volume 4, A-L. Gremese Editore, 1991 .

External links 
 

1976 films
Italian comedy films
1976 comedy films
1970s Italian-language films
Films directed by Pasquale Festa Campanile
Films scored by Armando Trovajoli
1970s Italian films